Phthiria pulicaria  is a species of ' bee flies' belonging to the family Bombyliidae.
It is a Palearctic species with a limited distribution in Europe

Description 
A tiny beefly 4-4.5mm long. "Scutellum all black or at the utmost with a yellow spot at its tip. Frons strongly prominent. Wings with the third posterior cell rather contracted towards the wingmargin."

Biology
Found  on bare patches of sand amongst short herbage near coast sand-hills.

References

External links
Van Veen Bee-flies (Diptera: Bombyliidae) of Northwest Europe

Bombyliidae
Insects described in 1796
Asilomorph flies of Europe